Kitu may refer to:

People
 Kitu Gidwani (born 1967), Indian actress and model

Places
 Kitu, Iran
 Kitu, Qechua name of Quito, Ecuador

Fictional characters
 Kitu from Kitu and Woofl
 Kitu Scott from Shortland Street

Other
 KITU-TV